The Long Beach Marine Stadium is a marine venue located in Long Beach, California. Created in 1932 to host the rowing events for the 1932 Summer Olympics in neighboring Los Angeles, the stadium was the first manmade rowing course in the United States.

History

The site was purchased in 1923 and Marine Stadium was created two years later when the Alamitos Bay was dredged to only  in length. An additional  was dredged by 1932 in time for the Olympics in LA. Turf replaced the temporary grandstands in 1997. The following year, the venue expanded to accommodate new teen and disabled rowing programs. Permanent restrooms replaced temporary ones in 2009.

The site is now registered as California Historical Landmark #1014.
Marker NO. 1014 at the site reads:
NO. 1014 LONG BEACH MARINE STADIUM - Created in 1932 for the rowing events of the Xth Olympiad, the Stadium was the first manmade rowing course in the United States. Its width allowed four teams to race abreast, eliminating additional heats and allowing oarsmen to enter the finals at the peak of their form. Later it served as the venue for the 1968 and 1976 United States men's Olympic rowing trials and the 1984 United States women's Olympic rowing trials. The site remains an important training and competitive center for rowers, including our National and Olympic teams.

1932 & 2028 Summer Olympics

The Long Beach Marine Stadium hosted the rowing competition at the 1932 Summer Olympics, the first time Los Angeles hosted the Olympics. The venue will host rowing and canoe sprint during the 2028 Summer Olympics. 

The stadium also hosted the United States rowing trials for the 1968 Summer Olympics that were held in Mexico City.

References

1932 Summer Olympics official report. pp. 70–73.
City of Long Beach, California Marine Stadium.
City of Long Beach California Marine Stadium history.

Venues of the 1932 Summer Olympics
Venues of the 2028 Summer Olympics
Olympic rowing venues
Olympic canoeing venues
Sports venues in Long Beach, California
Sports venues completed in 1932
1932 establishments in California